Paisley Canal railway station is a railway station in Paisley, Renfrewshire, Scotland. The station is managed by ScotRail and lies on the Paisley Canal Line.

History 

The original station was opened on 1 July 1885 by the Glasgow and South Western Railway, situated on a loop line to Elderslie Junction due to congestion on the line through . In the latter years the Kilmacolm service finished at 7pm. At some point the station buildings were taken out of use and an over-line booking office was built at the Causeyside Street end of the platforms.

The station closed to passengers on 10 January 1983, however seven years later a new train service was commenced on 28 July 1990. As the original station site had been sold and the platforms filled in, a new platform to the east of the Causeyside Street overbridge was constructed within the railway cutting.

Services 

On Sundays, an hourly service operates.

Rolling Stock 

Since the withdrawal of the last Class 314 EMUs in December 2019 (these having formed most of the trains on the Paisley Canal branch since its electrification in 2012), the majority of services at this station have been worked by Abellio ScotRail (ScotRail since 2022) Class 380s or Class 320s although occasionally Class 318 or Class 385 sets have appeared.

References

Notes

Sources

External links
YouTube video of Paisley Canal station
YouTube video of the Old Paisley Canal Station

Railway stations in Renfrewshire
SPT railway stations
Railway stations in Great Britain opened in 1885
Railway stations in Great Britain closed in 1983
Railway stations in Great Britain opened in 1990
Railway stations served by ScotRail
Former Glasgow and South Western Railway stations
Buildings and structures in Paisley, Renfrewshire
Transport in Paisley, Renfrewshire
1885 establishments in Scotland
1990 establishments in Scotland
1983 disestablishments in Scotland